The first season of the American television series Raising Hope premiered on September 21, 2010 and concluded on May 17, 2011 on the Fox Television Network. The show aired on Tuesday at 9:00 pm ET. The season consisted of 22 episodes and averaged 6.40 million viewers.

Cast

Main cast 
 Lucas Neff as Jimmy Chance
 Martha Plimpton as Virginia Chance
 Garret Dillahunt as Burt Chance
 Shannon Woodward as Sabrina Collins

Recurring cast 
 Baylie and Rylie Cregut as Hope Chance (born Princess Beyonce Carlyle)
 Cloris Leachman as Barbara June "Maw Maw" Thompson
 Gregg Binkley as Barney Hughes
 Kate Micucci as Shelley
 Todd Giebenhain as Frank Marolla
 Ray Santiago as Javier
 Jermaine Williams as Marcus
 Bijou Phillips as Lucy Carlyle
 Dan Coscino as Dancin' Dan
 Carla Jimenez as Rosa Flores
 Ryan Doom as Wyatt Gill
 Lou Wagner as Wally Phipps
 Skyler Stone as Mike Chance
 Eddie Steeples as Tyler, the Gas Man
 Tichina Arnold as Sylvia

Recurring cast in flashback 
 Kelly Heyer as teenage Virginia
 Cameron Moulene as teenage Burt
 Laura Avey as teenage Delilah
 Trace Garcia as 3-year-old Jimmy (credited as Trace!)
 Mason Cook as 8-year-old Jimmy
 Desiree Cooper as 8-year-old Virginia

Guest cast 
 Linda Gehringer as Louise Thompson
 Greg Germann as Dale Carlyle
 Valerie Mahaffey as Margine Carlyle
 Jason Lee as Smokey Floyd
 Brandon T. Jackson as Justin
 Phill Lewis as Donovan
 Amy Sedaris as Delilah
 J.K. Simmons as Bruce Chance
 Jerry Van Dyke as Mel
 Ethan Suplee as Andrew
 Jaime Pressly as Donna
 Malcolm Barrett as Howdy's west manager

Production 
In June 2009, FOX announced it had booked a put pilot commitment with show creator Greg Garcia. Michael Fresco signed on to direct the pilot in September 2009, which was originally titled Keep Hope Alive.

Fox green-lit the pilot to series with an order in mid-May 2010. On May 17, 2010, Fox announced at the upfront presentation that the series, with the new title Raising Hope, was included in its 2010-11 television schedule and set for a fall 2010 premiere.

On October 6, 2010, Fox ordered 9 more episodes of the first season, bringing the first season to 22 episodes.

Episodes

DVD release 
The complete first season of Raising Hope was released on DVD in region 1 on September 20, 2011, in region 2 on February 20, 2012 and in region 4 on September 21, 2011. The DVD set includes all 22 episodes of season one. Special features include Commentary Track on the Pilot episode, the Unaired Network Pilot, "Adorable Stars: Meet the Hopes", "Moments with Mrs. Chance", "Taking Chances: Shooting the Season Finale", Gag Reel, and Deleted and Extended Scenes.

The extended cut of the season finale, "Don't Vote for This Episode", includes a cliffhanger that was ultimately removed - Lucy returning, having not actually died in the pilot episode, to take Hope away. The character would have then been killed for good in the second season premiere. This plot was later used for the final two episodes of the second season.

Ratings

U.S.

References

External links 
 
 List of Raising Hope episodes at MSN TV
 List of Raising Hope episodes at The Futon Critic

2010 American television seasons
2011 American television seasons
Raising Hope